The Cambridge Companions to Music form a book series published by Cambridge University Press. Each book is a collection of essays on the topic commissioned by the publisher.

Volumes (sortable table)

References

External links
 Cambridge music series

Book series introduced in 1993
Cambridge University Press books
Series of books
Music guides
Lists of books